Estola columbiana is a species of beetle in the family Cerambycidae. It was described by Stephan von Breuning in 1940. It is known from Colombia, from which its species epithet is derived.

References

Estola
Beetles described in 1940